Shea Tiley (born December 2, 1996) is an American-born Canadian ice hockey goaltender, currently affiliated with the Toronto chapter of the Professional Women's Hockey Players Association (PWHPA). She made her debut with the Canadian women's national ice hockey team at the 2018 4 Nations Cup.

Playing career
Competing with the Saugeen-Maitland Lightning of the Lower Lakes Female Hockey, she captured a bronze medal during the league's 2013 postseason. Later that year, Tiley was named to Team Ontario Blue, where the roster would capture a silver medal at the 2013 National Women's Under-18 Championships.

She played the 2013–14 season with the Kitchener-Waterloo Lady Rangers of the Provincial Women's Hockey League (PWHL).

Hockey Canada
Prior to her appearance at the 2018 edition of the 4 Nations Cup, Tiley earned a gold medal with the Canadian women's national under-18 ice hockey team at the 2014 IIHF World Women's U18 Championship in Budapest, Hungary.

NCAA
Playing with the Clarkson Golden Knights women's ice hockey program, Tiley captured back-to-back NCAA Women's Ice Hockey Tournament championships in 2017 and 2018.

As a freshman, Tiley helped the Golden Knights qualify for the NCAA Tournament, appearing in the quarter-finals, while pacing all ECAC Hockey backstops in goals against average with a minuscule 1.16. She was also the conference goaltending leader in save percentage (.948) and wins (16), respectively. By season's end, she was recognized as both the ECAC Goaltender of the Year and Rookie of the Year. Worth noting, she was named to the ECAC First All-Star Team.

The 2015–16 season resulted in Tiley appearing in her first-ever NCAA Frozen Four with Clarkson. Her five shutouts would rank fifth in the NCAA while her goals against average of 1.32 placed sixth nationally.

For the month of December 2017, Tiley was recognized as the Hockey Commissioners Association National Division I Player of the Month. During said month, she posted an undefeated mark of 4-0-0, including a shutout. Her goals against average of 0.75 was the best of any goaltender in the ECAC Conference during the month of December. As a side note, she also recorded 79 saves on 82 shots, for a .963 save percentage.

CWHL
Tiley was a first round pick of the Toronto Furies in the 2018 CWHL Draft. Making her CWHL debut on October 14, 2018, Tiley allowed two goals in a loss to the Shenzhen KRS Rays. In her next start, she would rack up 28 saves for the first win of her CWHL career.

Hosting the Rays once again, the October 17 home match resulted in Tiley also being named the First Star of the Game, while teammate Emma Greco gained Second Star honors. Hannah Miller, who scored the Rays' only goal of the game against Tiley was recognized as the Third Star. With the score tied at 1–1 in the third, Sarah Nurse would record the first goal of her CWHL career on the power play. Recording said goal at the 8:54 mark of the third, it also stood as the game-winning goal. Laster in the period, Carolyne Prevost would score for the Furies in a 3–1 final.

PWHPA
Standing between the pipes for Team Sonnet (Toronto), Tiley participated in the 2021 Secret Cup, which was the Canadian leg of the 2020–21 PWHPA Dream Gap Tour. In a 4-2 championship game loss versus Team Bauer (Montreal), she had 25 saves.

Career stats

PWHL

Hockey Canada

NCAA

CWHL
2018-19 season in progress

Awards and honors

NCAA
2015 ECAC Goaltender of the Year 
2015 ECAC Rookie of the Year 
2015 ECAC First All-Star Team
2015 USCHO All-Rookie Team 
2017 ECAC tournament Most Outstanding Player
2017 ECAC Third All-Star Team 
2017 ECAC All-Tournament Team 
2017 ECAC All-Academic Team
2017 Second Team All-USCHO.com
ECAC Hockey Goaltender of the Month, October 2018
ECAC Hockey Goaltender of the Month, December 2018
Hockey Commissioners Association National Division I Player of the Month, December 2018
2018 Patty Kazmaier Memorial Award Top 10 Finalist 
2018 First Team AHCA All-American
2018 NCAA Frozen Four Most Valuable Player
2017–18 NCAA leader, Minutes Played (2405:32)
2017–18 NCAA leader, Save Percentage (.945)
2017–18 NCAA leader, Wins (35)
2017–18 Co-NCAA leader, Shutouts (12)

Personal
Her father, Brad Tiley was selected by the Boston Bruins in the 1991 NHL Entry Draft, competing numerous seasons in the American Hockey League.

References

1996 births
Canadian women's ice hockey goaltenders
Ice hockey people from Ontario
Living people
Clarkson Golden Knights women's ice hockey players
Toronto Furies players
Professional Women's Hockey Players Association players